Kampung Bandan Station (KPB) is a railway station located in North Jakarta. This station is located close to WTC Mangga Dua.

This station has elevated and ground-level tracks. The elevated level tracks are used by trains between Jakarta Kota and Tanjung Priuk, as the Tanjung Priuk Line. The ground tracks are used by trains going to Cikarang as the Cikarang Loop Line. This station has been hit by floods numerous times.

There was once a plan to build apartements on PT KAI's land near this station and they would be integrated with the KRL Commuterline and the Jakarta MRT. These apartements will be occupied by residents who used to live on the banks of the railroad tracks around this station. To the north of the station on the upper side, there is also the Jakarta Kota Train Depot, only 200 meters to Jakarta Kota Station.

On December 17, 2015, the upper line of this station was fully operational, serving the Tanjung Priuk–Jakarta Kota route.

Building and layout 
The currently active Kampung Bandan Station now has an upper line and also a lower line, which is used to replace the old station which is located slightly to the north of this station.  There are two elevation figures for this station since the installation of the 2020 version of the station nameplate, namely +3 m for the lower side and +5 m for the upper side. The lower line goes to Pasar Senen, while the upper line goes to Ancol.

Previously the entrance was located on the north side towards Ancol, but since the development of the south side (Mangga Dua, Harco, etc.) was so fast, the north gate was not active at all. Currently, both gates of Kampung Bandan Station can be used.

Services
The following is a list of train services at the Kampung Bandan Station.

Passenger services 
 KAI Commuter
  Cikarang Loop Line (Full Racket)

Supporting transportation

Incidents 

 On October 30, 2020, a KRL Commuterline EMU derailed at the Kampung Bandan Station. This drop causes the train to tilt. This incident resulted in the Bogor-Jatinegara KRL only ending its journey at Angke Station, the Bekasi-Jakarta Kota KRL ending its journey at Kemayoran Station, and the Jatinegara-Bogor KRL being diverted to Manggarai Station. The evacuation took an estimated 5 hours from 11.30 WIB and there were no casualties.

References

External links

north Jakarta
Railway stations in Jakarta